Đorđe Andrejević-Kun (31 March 1904 – 17 January 1964) was a Serbian painter and academic. He designed the Coat of Arms of the City of Belgrade and reputedly designed the Coat of arms of the Socialist Federal Republic of Yugoslavia and Yugoslav orders and medals (along with Antun Augustinčić).

Life
Djordje was born to the Serbian father and a German mother, but most of his education was carried out in Berlin and Belgrade. He was a graduate of the "Belgrade Academy of Art". He further studied in Italy (1926–1928) and Paris, France (1928–1929). In 1931, his design won First Prize for the Coat of Arms of the City of Belgrade, which it remains today. In 1931 and 1932, he had one-man shows in Belgrade, Zagreb, and Novi Sad.

In 1934, he joined in forming the Život group (AKA Life Group) of Yugoslavian artists. His woodcut set Blood-soaked Gold (Krvavo zlato) was published in 1937. He fought with the International Brigades in the Spanish Civil War during which time his woodcut set For Freedom (Za sloboda) was published in 1939. The next year he published his collection Sketches, Drawing, And Studies (Skice, crtezi, studije) in Spain. From 1941 to 1945, he was a member of the "Yugoslav National Liberation" forces.

In 1946, his drawings Partisans (Partizani) were awarded the Yugoslav Federation Prize for Graphics, and in 1949, his oil work Witnesses of Horror (Svedoci užasa), the Yugoslav Federation Prize for Painting. In 1951–1953 he belonged to the Independents (Samostalni). In 1945, he joined the faculty, as full-professor, of the "Academy of Fine Arts" in Belgrade, and, from 1959 to 1963, he was Dean of the Department of Fine Arts of the University of Belgrade, after the Academy had been incorporated into the University.

In 1950, he was elected a corresponding member of the "Academy of Arts and Sciences", and in 1958, a full member. From 1957 to 1960, he was president of the Yugoslav Federation of Artists. In the years following World War II, he had one-man shows in Belgrade (1953 and 1959), Kragujevac, Čačak, Niš, Skopje, Zemun, and Sombor, and in Berlin in 1963.

The inventory of his work lists some 300 paintings, among them the monumental as well as the small and intimate. More than 60 are in museums in the country and abroad, about as many are owned by government institutions and enterprises, and the rest are in private collections. Over 1000 drawings are listed; most of them are in museum collections. The few surviving complete, first-print sets of Blood-soaked Gold and For Freedom are owned by museums in Belgrade. He has three mosaics, one at the War Memorial in Ivanjica, a second on the façade of a public building in Kragujevac, and the third at the Holocaust Museum in Paris.

Djordje Andrejević-Kun died on 17 January 1964, in Belgrade.

Controversy
During 1944 wide purges under bolshevik auspices in Belgrade following the city's liberation from the Nazi Germans by the Soviet Red Army and Communist-led Yugoslav Partisans, 40-year-old Andrejević-Kun and his wife Nada moved into the apartment belonging to painter Branko Popović only few days after Popović got executed by the new communist authorities. The speed and the manner with which Andrejević-Kun took over his dead colleague's property (Popović's surviving family: his wife Divna and their three children Simeon, Prijezda, and Borivoje were in the meantime kicked out of the apartment by the authorities) raised questions that Popović's prominently located property at 24 Knez Mihailova Street was the real reason behind Popović's execution without trial.

Gallery

References

External links

Biography (PD)

1904 births
1964 deaths
Academic staff of the University of Belgrade
Artists from Wrocław
20th-century Serbian painters
20th-century Serbian male artists
Rectors of the University of Arts in Belgrade
Serbian male painters
German emigrants to Yugoslavia